The Kohelet Policy Forum (KPF or Kohelet) is a conservative, right-wing Israeli nonprofit think tank. It was founded in January 2012 by Professor Moshe Koppel, who now serves as the Forum's chairman, together with several Israeli academics such as Avraham Diskin, Avi Bell, Emmanuel Navon and Yitzhak Klein, public figures, intellectuals and activists.

The KPF has three main goals, according to its website: to secure Israel's future as the nation-state of the Jewish people, to strengthen representative democracy, and to broaden individual liberty and free-market principles in Israel. In pursuit of the first aim, the forum has promoted the Basic Law proposal: Israel as the Nation-State of the Jewish People.

Jewish national policy

Judicial policy 

The forum encourages democratic accountability and judicial responsibility, while discouraging unjust judicial activism and the undue legalization of the public realm. Their work underpins the 2023 Judicial reform in Israel, although Chairman Koppel has come out against the "override clause".

However, The KPF does not come out against the Supreme Court as an institution and has filed friend of the court briefs in a number of appeals.

Economic policy 
A dedicated unit within KPF, the Kohelet Economic Forum, is particularly focused on the pursuit of the third goal: broadening individual liberty and free-market principles. KEF, headed by former senior Treasury official Michael Sarel, has a staff of economists and has published dozens of detailed policy papers on economic policies in Israel. In July 2021, Zehava Galon wrote in Haaretz that the Kohelet Policy Forum "with foreign funding, is trying to turn Israel into a fundamentalist state under the guise of liberalism."

Network 
The KPF founded the Shiloh Policy Forum, a settlement organisation, and pays the salaries of three of its staff. In February 2023, Kohelet research fellow Avital Ben-Shelomo became director general of the Education Ministry of Israel. Both founders of Next Generation – Parents for Choice in Education are KPF researchers. Several other NGOs, including the Coalition for Autonomy in Education, Choosing Educations, Tacharut – the Movement for Freedom of Employment (which works against the Histadrut), Our Interes – Your Lobby in the Knesset, Hamerchav Shelanu ("Our Space"), are also part of the KPF network, although the links are not widely publicised. The KPF trained a group of anti-LGBTQ groups. The Civil Society Forum is connected to KPF. The Israeli Immigration Policy Center has worked alongside KPF.

Resources 
According to its own account, KPF is a non-governmental organization which relies only on private donations and does not accept public funds from any government, domestic or foreign. The largest donations have been made anonymously, and amount to several million dollars sent through an American nonprofit organization called American Friends of Kohelet Policy Forum. An investigative article published at Haaretz presented conjectures regarding the identity of some major donors, but neither KPF nor the individuals named in the article confirmed these conjectures. The Forum's legislative research, policy papers, and other research based products are offered to Israeli decision makers for free.

References

External links 
 

Think tanks based in Israel
Organizations based in Jerusalem
Non-profit organizations based in Israel